Hunter Street railway station is a under construction station on the Sydney Metro West that will serve the Sydney central business district. It will be built on the corner of Hunter and George Streets and Bligh and O’Connell Streets. Construction is scheduled to commence in 2022.

References

Railway stations scheduled to open in 2030

Proposed Sydney Metro stations